Tomás and the Library Lady is a children's picture book written by Mexican-American writer Pat Mora and illustrated by Raúl Colón. Based on a true story, it details the circumstances behind Tomás Rivera, the son of a migrant farm worker during the 1940s in the Midwest United States.  Feeling a little out of place since his family's move to Iowa from Texas and wanting to know more than just his grandfather's stories, Tomás stumbles into a library and is welcomed by the librarian.  Through her patience and understanding, Tomás develops a love for books and learning that he always wanted to have.  The warmth and graciousness of the librarian was a catalyst to Tomás' lifelong love of learning which culminated in his becoming a chancellor at a university. Wonderfully illustrated and culturally accurate, Tomás and the Library Lady is a great book for a beginning reader and tells of a great story of understanding, patience and perseverance.

1997 children's books
American picture books
Fiction set in the 1940s

References